Leah Lopez Navarro is a Filipino singer.

References

External links
gmanews.tv/story, Black and White group blasts PET for trashing Loren protest

Filipino women pop singers
Filipino jazz singers
Filipino people of Chinese descent
Assumption College San Lorenzo alumni
1958 births
Living people
Singers from Metro Manila